Bring It On is a series of cheerleading films that began with Bring It On (2000) and was followed by five direct-to-video sequels and one Halloween-themed television film sequel, none of which contain any of the original film's cast members.

The first film was loosely adapted into a musical, which has received positive critical response and praise.

Films
 Bring It On (2000)
 Bring It On Again (2004)
 Bring It On: All or Nothing (2006)
 Bring It On: In It to Win It (2007)
 Bring It On: Fight to the Finish (2009)
 Bring It On: Worldwide Cheersmack (2017)
 Bring It On: Cheer or Die (2022)

Cast

Principal cast

Stage musical

The film series expanded its reach when it was made into Bring It On: The Musical, with music by Lin-Manuel Miranda and Tom Kitt, and lyrics by Miranda and Amanda Green. The play also has a book written by Jeff Whitty.

References

External links
 
 
 
 
 
 
 

 
Comedy film series
Film series introduced in 2000
American film series
Universal Pictures franchises
Films about competitions